Mostyska II is a railway station in the village Mostyska Druhi, Yavoriv Raion in Lviv Oblast of Ukraine. It is part of the Lviv administration (Lviv Railways).

The station is located on the historical Galician Railway of Archduke Charles Louis linking Kraków with Lviv through Przemyśl. 

Today it constitutes an important transportation gateway between Ukraine and the rest of Europe on the Pan-European Corridor III. There is a break of gauge where the railway systems of the two countries meet, as the Ukrainian part of the route was converted to Russian broad gauge during Soviet rule. To speed up though traffic, a track gauge changing facility of the SUW 2000 variable gauge axle system has been installed to allow fitted trains to pass through the break of gauge at walking pace.

See also
 Poland-Ukraine border

References

External links
 Mostyska II railway station

!Previous station!!!!Operator!!!!Next Station

1950 establishments in the Soviet Union
Lviv Railways stations
Poland–Ukraine border crossings
Railway stations in Lviv Oblast